The 2020–21 Michigan Wolverines men's hockey team was the Wolverines' 99th season. They represented the University of Michigan in the 2020–21 NCAA Division I men's ice hockey season. The team was coached by Mel Pearson, in his fourth year as head coach, and played their home games at Yost Ice Arena. The Wolverines received an at-large bid to the 2021 NCAA Tournament, however, they were removed from the tournament due to positive COVID-19 test results within the program.

Previous season
During the 2019–20 ice hockey season, Michigan went 18–14–4, including 11–10–3–2 in Big Ten play in a shortened season that was cancelled due to the COVID-19 pandemic.

Season
As a result of the ongoing COVID-19 pandemic the entire college ice hockey season was delayed. Because the NCAA had previously announced that all winter sports athletes would retain whatever eligibility they possessed through at least the following year, none of North Dakota's players would lose a season of play. However, the NCAA also approved a change in its transfer regulations that would allow players to transfer and play immediately rather than having to sit out a season, as the rules previously required.

Departures

Recruiting

Roster
As of September 1, 2020

Coaching staff

Standings

Schedule and results

|-
!colspan=12 style=";" | Regular season

|- style="background:#bbbbbb"
| March 10
| TBA
| at Michigan State
|
| Munn Ice Arena • East Lansing, MI (Rivalry)
| colspan=5 rowspan=1 style="text-align:center"|Cancelled due to the COVID-19 pandemic
|-
!colspan=12 style=";" | 

|-
!colspan=12 style=";" | 
|- style="background:#bbbbbb"
| March 26
| 4:00 PM
| vs. #9 Minnesota Duluth
| align=center|#8
| Scheels Arena • Fargo, ND (Regional semifinals)
| ESPNU
| colspan=5 rowspan=1 style="text-align:center"|Cancelled due to COVID-19 protocols

Rankings

USCHO did not release a poll in week 20.

Awards and honors

Players drafted into the NHL
Michigan had four players selected in the 2020 NHL Entry Draft. Brendan Brisson was drafted in the first-round, becoming the 25th first-round NHL Draft selection for Michigan, which leads all NCAA teams. Michigan had three players drafted in the 2021 NHL Entry Draft. Owen Power became the first Wolverine to be drafted first overall.

References

External links
 Official Website

Michigan Wolverines men's ice hockey seasons
Michigan 
Michigan 
Michigan 
Michigan ice hockey
Michigan ice hockey